Elena Giurcă (11 January 1946 – September 2013) was a Romanian rowing coxswain. She took up rowing in 1966 and debuted internationally at the 1969 European Championships, winning a bronze medal in the eights. Later, she mostly competed in the quadruple sculls, finishing third and fourth at the 1976 and 1980 Summer Olympics, respectively. She also won silver medals in this event at the 1974 and 1977 world championships.

In 1969, Giurcă graduated in English from the University of Bucharest, and later taught English at a military academy. She died aged 67 after surgery for a brain aneurysm.

References

External links 
 
 
 
 

1946 births
2013 deaths
Romanian female rowers
Coxswains (rowing)
Olympic rowers of Romania
Rowers at the 1976 Summer Olympics
Rowers at the 1980 Summer Olympics
Olympic bronze medalists for Romania
Olympic medalists in rowing
World Rowing Championships medalists for Romania
Medalists at the 1976 Summer Olympics
European Rowing Championships medalists